A List of Czech films of the 1930s.

1930s
Czech
Films